Ophthalmoconalia is a genus of beetles in the family Mordellidae, containing the following species:

 Ophthalmoconalia castanea Ermisch, 1968
 Ophthalmoconalia strandi Horák, 1994

References

Mordellidae